The Cardener is a river in Catalonia, Spain. Its source is at Les Fonts del Cardener in the 
It drains a basin of 
. It passes through the reservoir of Sant Ponç (25 hm3) between Olius and 
Clariana de Cardener (Solsonès), Cardona, Súria and Manresa (Bages) before joining the Llobregat 
from the left at Castellgalí (Bages).

See also 
 List of rivers of Spain

Rivers of Spain
Rivers of Catalonia